Uitsaai Projek (Afrikaans: Broadcasting Project) is a solo musical project created by Christiaan Barnard in 2009 to show the general public the difficulty for a musician in South Africa to get recognized, as well as to secure airplay on South African radio stations. He wrote all the songs, did all vocals, and played all instruments on the album, as well as handled all pre- and post-editing work out of Springs, South Africa. Barnard wanted to see how many years it would take an independent musician to make it in the industry, as well as how much money it would cost, and whom one would have to know.

Barnard released his first studio album in 2009 under www.rythmrecords.co.za with the name "Grensloos" (Afrikaans for limitless or borderless). Its first single, "Hartseer", had immediate success on www.samp3.co.za and was featured amongst the likes of Van Coke Kartel, Navi Red, and Die Heuwels Fantasties. The song reached top 10 status within a week of release, and was followed with success by "Skepe Op Die See".

The next phase of the project will kick off in 2015 with rare covers from famous artists like Don Williams, Roxette, CCR, and Bryan Adams. It will feature mostly acoustic sets, focusing on melodies, progressions, and voice.

Chris was born on 7 December 1982 in Newcastle, KwaZulu-Natal, and has been a solo artist for 14 years. He is known for his raspy voice and poetic, yet melodic, tunes. 
 
Afrikaans songs like "Hartseer" and "Skewe Woorde" are doing rounds on some online broadcasts, but have yet to be recognized in South Africa as totally independent projects, and no air play has been given them locally.

The second studio album will be recorded in January 2016 to mid May and will include covers from: Nazareth, Waite and Bryan Adams. This amidst a fresh approach to produce top quality artwork by Christiaan Barnard.

Afrikaans albums